The official name for slums in Namibia is informal settlements. Colloquial names include location, shanty town, township, and ghetto. In 2018 there were 308 urban slums all over Namibia with close to 1 million inhabitants, about 40% of the population.

 Windhoek
 Goreangab, near Goreangab Dam
 Greenwell Matongo
 Hakahana
 Havana
 Katutura
 Mix camp
 Okahandja Park
 Okuryangava
 Otjomuise
 Katima Mulilo
 Choto
 Okahandja
 Vyf Rand
 Swakopmund
 Mondesa
 Democratic Resettlement Community
 Walvis Bay
 Kuisebmond

See also
 List of slums

References

Shanty towns in Namibia
Namibia
Namibia
Slums